Stichtite is a mineral, a carbonate of chromium and magnesium; formula Mg6Cr2CO3(OH)16·4H2O.   Its colour ranges from pink through lilac to a rich purple colour.   It is formed as an alteration product of chromite containing serpentine. It occurs in association with barbertonite (the hexagonal polymorph of Mg6Cr2CO3(OH)16·4H2O), chromite and antigorite.

Discovered in 1910 on the west coast of Tasmania, Australia, it was first recognised by A.S. Wesley a former chief chemist with the Mount Lyell Mining and Railway Company, it was named after Robert Carl Sticht the manager of the mine.

It is observed in combination with green serpentine at Stichtite Hill near the Dundas Extended Mine, Dundas - east of Zeehan, as well as on the southern shore of Macquarie Harbour.  It is exhibited in the West Coast Pioneers Museum in Zeehan. The only commercial mine for stichtite serpentine is located on Stichtite Hill. Stichtite has also been reported from the Barberton District, Transvaal; Darwendale, Zimbabwe;  near Bou Azzer, Morocco; Cunningsburgh, the Shetland Islands of Scotland; Langban, Varmland, Sweden; the Altai Mountains, Russia; Langmuir Township, Ontario and the Megantic, Quebec; Bahia, Brazil; and the Keonjhar district, Orissa, India.

It is sometimes used as a gemstone.

References

External links

 http://www.asap.unimelb.edu.au/bsparcs/biogs/P002619b.htm Sticht, Robert Carl – Bright Sparcs Biographical entry

Magnesium minerals
Chromium minerals
Carbonate minerals
Western Tasmania
Trigonal minerals
Minerals in space group 166
Gemstones